Lorenzo Gagli (born 14 October 1985) is an Italian professional golfer. He won the 2018 Barclays Kenya Open, his first win on the Challenge Tour.

Professional career
Gagli turned professional in 2006.

He spent 2007 on the Alps Tour, where he finished fourth on the Order of Merit. As a result, he was promoted to the Challenge Tour, where he played for the 2008 season. He graduated from the qualifying school in 2008 to earn promotion for the European Tour in 2009, but struggled for form at that level and divided his season between the European and Challenge Tours. He again came through qualifying school at the end of 2009, but once again bounced between tours for 2010. A strong finish to the year left him 17th on the Challenge Tour rankings, which earned him promotion to the European Tour once more for 2011. His best finishes on the European Tour are a T3 at the 2011 Barclays Scottish Open and sole 2nd at the 2011 Madrid Masters.  Gagli has been featured in the top 150 of the Official World Golf Ranking.

Professional wins (5)

Challenge Tour wins (1)

Challenge Tour playoff record (1–0)

Alps Tour wins (3)

Other wins (1)
2010 Italian PGA Championship

Playoff record
European Tour playoff record (0–1)

Team appearances
Amateur
Jacques Léglise Trophy (representing Continental Europe): 2003
European Youths' Team Championship (representing Italy): 2004, 2006
European Amateur Team Championship (representing Italy): 2005
Eisenhower Trophy (representing Italy): 2006
St Andrews Trophy (representing the Continent of Europe): 2006

Professional
European Championships (representing Italy): 2018

See also
2008 European Tour Qualifying School graduates
2009 European Tour Qualifying School graduates
2010 Challenge Tour graduates
2017 European Tour Qualifying School graduates
2018 Challenge Tour graduates

References

External links

Italian male golfers
European Tour golfers
Sportspeople from Florence
1985 births
Living people
20th-century Italian people
21st-century Italian people